Rhexinema is a genus of green algae in the order Ulotrichales. Recent research has suggested that the genus Helicodictyon is a synonym of Rhexinema.

References

Ulvophyceae genera
Ulotrichales